Manown is an unincorporated community in Preston County, West Virginia, United States.

The community derives its name from the local Manown family.

References 

Unincorporated communities in West Virginia
Unincorporated communities in Preston County, West Virginia